Robbie Tucker (born April 5, 2001) is an American actor. His best known role to date is that of Fenmore Baldwin on the CBS soap opera The Young and the Restless. Tucker has also starred on other series, such as Criminal Minds, FlashForward and It's Always Sunny in Philadelphia. He has also appeared in the films Prom and Little Fockers.

In 2012, Tucker was nominated at the 33rd Young Artist Awards for his performance in Prom and won for his role in The Young and the Restless.

He is also the brother of actress Jillian Rose Reed.

Filmography

References

External links
 

American male television actors
2001 births
Living people
Place of birth missing (living people)
21st-century American male actors
American male film actors
American male soap opera actors